John Hardy Isakson (December 28, 1944 – December 19, 2021) was an American businessman and politician who served as a United States senator from Georgia from 2005 to 2019 as a member of the Republican Party. He represented  in the United States House of Representatives from 1999 to 2005.

Born in Atlanta, Georgia, Isakson served in the Georgia Air National Guard (1966–1972) and graduated from the University of Georgia. He opened a real estate branch for Northside Realty and later served 22 years as the company's president. After a failed bid for the Georgia House of Representatives in 1974, he was elected in 1976. He served seven terms, including four as minority leader. Isakson was the Republican candidate for governor of Georgia in 1990, but lost. Two years later, he was elected to the Georgia Senate and served one term. He unsuccessfully ran in the Republican primary in the 1996 U.S. Senate election.

After 6th District Congressman and Speaker of the House Newt Gingrich resigned, Isakson ran in the February 1999 special election to succeed him, winning by a 40-point margin. He ran for the U.S. Senate in 2004 after Democratic incumbent Zell Miller opted not to run for re-election. With the backing of much of Georgia's Republican establishment, he won both the primary and general elections by wide margins. He became the senior senator from Georgia when Saxby Chambliss retired in 2015. On December 31, 2019, midway through his third Senate term, Isakson resigned from the Senate due to health concerns and was succeeded by fellow Republican Kelly Loeffler who was appointed by Brian Kemp, the Republican Governor of Georgia, to fill the vacant seat.

Early life, education, and real estate career
Isakson was born on December 28, 1944, in Atlanta, Georgia, the son of Julia (née Baker) and Edwin Andrew Isakson, a Greyhound bus driver, who later established an Atlanta real estate firm. His paternal grandparents were of Swedish descent, and his paternal grandfather was born in Östersund.  His mother was of mostly British ancestry, and her family has been in the American South since the colonial era.

Isakson served in the Georgia Air National Guard from 1966 to 1972, leaving service as a staff sergeant. Isakson enrolled at the University of Georgia, where he became a member of the Sigma Alpha Epsilon social fraternity. Shortly after graduating from UGA, he opened the first Cobb County office of Northside Realty, a prominent Atlanta-area real estate firm that his father, Ed, helped to establish. Isakson became company president in 1979, a post he held for 22 years, during which Northside became the biggest independent real estate company in the Southeast and one of the largest in the United States.

Early political career (1974–1998)

Georgia House of Representatives
In 1974, Isakson first ran for the Georgia House of Representatives in an eastern Cobb County district and lost. He ran again in 1976 and won. He served seven terms in the House. He won re-election unopposed in 1984 and 1988. In his last four terms (1983–1990), he was the Republican Minority leader. In 1988 and 1996, he was co-chair for U.S. Senator Bob Dole's presidential primary campaigns.

1990 gubernatorial election

Isakson was the Republican candidate for Governor of Georgia in 1990. He won the Republican primary with 74% of the vote in a four candidate field. In the general election, he was defeated by Democratic Lieutenant Governor Zell Miller 53%–45%. His campaign was managed by Jay Morgan while Miller's campaign was managed by James Carville. Miller ran on a pledge to start a state lottery and use the revenue for public schools. Isakson proposed a ballot referendum on the lottery.

Georgia Senate

In 1992, Isakson was elected to the Georgia Senate.

1996 U.S. Senate election

In 1996, Isakson ran in the Republican primary for the U.S. Senate seat being vacated by retiring Democratic U.S. Senator Sam Nunn. During his campaign, Isakson expressed his support for abortion rights in a campaign advertisement. Isakson finished second in the primary election with 35% of the vote, but the winner Guy Millner, a millionaire businessman, failed to get a majority of the vote (receiving only 42%). Therefore, per Georgia law, he was forced into a primary runoff election. Millner defeated Isakson in the runoff 53%–47%. Millner lost the general election to Democrat Max Cleland.

In December 1996, Isakson was appointed head of the State Board of Education by Gov. Zell Miller.

U.S. House of Representatives (1999–2005)

Elections
1999
In November 1998, 6th District U.S. Congressman and Speaker of the House Newt Gingrich faced a revolt in his caucus after the Republicans lost five seats in the midterm elections. Amid the turmoil, Gingrich announced on Friday after the Tuesday elections not only that he would not run for a third term as Speaker, but he would also not take his seat for an eleventh term beginning in January 1999. Isakson ran for the seat in a special election in February.  He won the election with 65% of the vote,  forty points ahead of the second-place finisher Christina Fawcett Jeffrey.

2000
Isakson won re-election to his first full term with 74.75% of the vote.

2002
Isakson won re-election to his second full term with 79.87% of the vote.

Tenure
During his tenure in the House of Representatives, Isakson served on the Committee on Education and the Workforce, aiding President Bush in passing the No Child Left Behind Act. As a Representative, Isakson sponsored 27 bills. He was a member of the U.S. House Education Committee. In October 2002, Isakson voted in favor of the authorization of force against the country of Iraq.

U.S. Senate (2005–2019)

Elections

2004 

In early 2003, conservative Democratic U.S. Senator Zell Miller—who had been appointed to fill out the term of the late Republican Senator Paul Coverdell and elected to the post in his own right in 2000—declared his intention not to run for a full term in the Senate in 2004. Isakson immediately entered the race. He faced 8th District U.S. Congressman Mac Collins and businessman Herman Cain in the primary.

It was initially thought Isakson would face a difficult primary since many socially conservative Republicans still felt chagrin at Isakson's declared support for abortion rights in 1990.  However, he won the Republican primary with 53%, with Cain a distant second and Collins third, averting the need for a runoff. In the general election, he easily defeated the Democratic candidate, 4th District Congresswoman Denise Majette, by 18 points. Isakson's election marked the first time in Georgia's history that both of the state's U.S. Senate seats had been held by Republicans, as Saxby Chambliss had won the other seat by defeating Nunn's successor, Max Cleland, two years earlier.

2010 

In 2010, Isakson was unopposed in the primary. He won re-election with 58.3% of the vote in 2010, defeating State Commissioner of Labor Mike Thurmond.

2016 

Isakson was re-elected to a third term in 2016 with 54.8% of the vote.

Tenure and legislation
As a senator, Isakson sponsored or co-sponsored 130 bills, just 8 of which became law.

In 2010, Isakson apologized for referring to voters as "the unwashed" in off-hand comments, saying he "didn't mean anything derogatory by it."

Isakson resigned from the Senate for health reasons on December 31, 2019. He is the longest serving Republican senator in the history of Georgia.

Committee assignments
Committee on Finance
Subcommittee on International Trade, Customs and Global Competitiveness
Subcommittee on Social Security, Pensions and Family Policy
Subcommittee on Taxation and IRS Oversight
Committee on Health, Education, Labor, and Pensions
Subcommittee on Employment and Workplace Safety (Chairman)
Committee on Veterans' Affairs (Chairman)
Select Committee on Ethics (Chairman)
Committee on Foreign Relations
Subcommittee on African Affairs
Subcommittee on East Asian and Pacific Affairs

Political positions 
When compared to his Republican peers in the Senate, Isakson was neither more liberal than average nor more conservative than average.

Abortion
During his campaign for U.S. senator in 1996, Isakson expressed his support for abortion rights in a campaign advertisement. In 2005, Isakson reportedly identified himself as pro-life with exceptions. In March 2017, Isakson—who was recovering from back surgery—came to the U.S. Capitol in a wheelchair to vote to repeal an Obama administration rule that had made it unlawful for states to bar abortion providers from receiving Title X funding. The Senate vote on the bill was 50–50, and Vice President Mike Pence cast a tie-breaking vote that allowed the bill to pass.

Agriculture 
In July 2019, Isakson was one of eight senators to introduce the Agricultural Trucking Relief Act, a bill that would alter the definition of an agricultural commodity to include both horticultural and aquacultural products and promote a larger consistency in regulation through both federal and state agencies as part of an attempt to ease regulatory burdens on trucking and the agri-community.

Gun laws
In 2017, Isakson said that while he did support concealed carry nationwide, he did not support campus carry and stated that it is "not the appropriate thing to do."

In February 2018, in response to the Stoneman Douglas High School shooting, Isakson said, "We have to do everything we can within our powers to make sure it never happens again."

Healthcare
Isakson voted against the Patient Protection and Affordable Care Act and voted more than 60 times to repeal it.

Immigration
In 2019, Isakson voted to support President Donald Trump's national emergency declaration regarding border security.

Personal life
Isakson and his wife, Dianne, were married in 1968, and had three children. His wife is a watercolor artist, and served as honorary co-chair for Marietta's Theatre in the Square playhouse in 2007.

Health and death
In June 2015, Isakson disclosed that he had been diagnosed with Parkinson's disease, but added that the diagnosis would not affect his 2016 re-election plans.  He continued his campaign and was elected in November 2016 to serve a third six-year term in the Senate.  On August 28, 2019, however, Isakson announced that he would resign his Senate seat for health reasons on December 31, 2019.

Isakson died at his home in Atlanta on December 19, 2021, nine days short of his 77th birthday.

Electoral history

See also

References

External links 

Senator Johnny Isakson official U.S. Senate website
Johnny Isakson for Senate

|-

|-

|-

|-

|-

|-

|-

|-

|-

|-

1944 births
2021 deaths
20th-century American businesspeople
20th-century American politicians
21st-century American politicians
American people of British descent
American people of Swedish descent
American real estate businesspeople
Businesspeople from Atlanta
Candidates in the 1990 United States elections
Candidates in the 1996 United States elections
Deaths from Parkinson's disease
Republican Party Georgia (U.S. state) state senators
Georgia National Guard personnel
Republican Party members of the Georgia House of Representatives
Military personnel from Georgia (U.S. state)
Neurological disease deaths in Georgia (U.S. state)
Politicians from Atlanta
Republican Party United States senators from Georgia (U.S. state)
Republican Party members of the United States House of Representatives from Georgia (U.S. state)
United States Air Force airmen
University of Georgia alumni